

Yoav Freund (born 1961) is an Israeli professor of computer science at the University of California San Diego who mainly works on machine learning, probability theory and related fields and applications.

He is best known for his work on the AdaBoost algorithm, an ensemble learning algorithm which is used to combine many "weak" learning machines to create a more robust one. He and Robert Schapire received the Gödel prize in 2003 for their joint work on AdaBoost.

He is an alumnus of the prestigious Talpiot program of the Israeli army.

Selected works

References

External links
Freund's homepage at UCSD

Living people
American computer scientists
Gödel Prize laureates
University of California, San Diego faculty
University of California, Santa Cruz alumni
1961 births